Abu Dhabi Commercial Bank PJSC, commonly called ADCB, is a bank in the United Arab Emirates.

Abu Dhabi Commercial Bank (ADCB) was formed in 1985 as a public shareholding company with limited liability, following the mergers between Emirates Commercial Bank, Federal Commercial Bank, and Khaleej Commercial Bank, which was established in 1975.

The Government of Abu Dhabi through the Abu Dhabi Investment Council (ADIC) holds 62.52% of ADCB shares; the remainder is held by other institutions and individuals. ADCB is the third-largest bank in the UAE in terms of balance sheet size and offers a range of commercial and retail banking services to its customers.

As of 30 September 2018, it employs over 5000 people  serving retail and corporate clients. Aside from 56 branches in the UAE, it has 1 branch in Jersey. It also operates out of representative offices in Singapore and London.

In January 2019, a 3 bank merger was announced between ADCB, Union National Bank and Al Hilal Bank. The combined bank continues to operate as ADCB although Al Hilal Bank  operates as a standalone Islamic bank consolidated under the new group entity.

ADCB Group will become the  fifth largest bank in the region with approximately 1 million customers.

Area of Business 
The Bank is a United Arab Emirates-based public joint stock company that provides retail, commercial, investment, merchant, brokerage and fund management activities through its network of 48 branches in the United Arab Emirates and 1 in the UK.

See also
List of banks
List of banks in United Arab Emirates

References 

Companies listed on the Abu Dhabi Securities Exchange
Banks of the United Arab Emirates
Banks established in 1985
Companies based in Abu Dhabi
Emirati companies established in 1985